Tang Feiyao (born August 5, 2003) is a Chinese pair skater. With her former partner, Yang Yongchao, she has competed in the final segment at two World Junior Championships and finished within the top four at the 2019 edition.

Programs 
(with Yang)

Competitive highlights 
GP: Grand Prix; CS: Challenger Series; JGP: Junior Grand Prix

Pairs with Yang

Ladies' singles

References

External links 
 

2003 births
Chinese female pair skaters
Living people
Figure skaters from Harbin